Danilevičius and Danilavičius are Lithuanized forms of the Polish surnames Danilewicz and Danilowicz. Notable people with this surname include:

Tomas Danilevičius (born 1978), Lithuanian former professional footballer and president of the Lithuanian Football Federation
 (born 1963), Lithuanian politician

Lithuanian-language surnames